Barker is a surname of English origin, meaning "a tanner of leather". Barker may refer to:

A–C
 Abraham Andrews Barker (1816–1898), American politician 
 Al Barker (1839–1912), American baseball player
 Alfred Charles Barker (1819–1873), New Zealand doctor and photographer
 Arj Barker (born 1974), American comedian, actor
 Arthur "Doc" Barker (1899–1939), American criminal
 Audrey Barker (1932–2002), British artist
 Ben Barker (racing driver) (born 1991), British racing driver
 Ben Barker (speedway rider) (born 1988), British speedway rider
 Benjamin Barker, known as Sweeney Todd, fictional killer, barber
 Bernard Barker (1917–2009), Watergate burglar
 Betty Barker (1921–2018), American politician
 Bill Barker (police officer), died in the November 2009 Great Britain and Ireland floods
 Bob Barker (born 1923), game show host, television personality
 Burt Brown Barker (1873–1969), Oregon preservationist, administrator
 Cam Barker (born 1986), Canadian ice hockey player
 Charles Spackman Barker (1804–1879), British inventor and organ builder
 Cheryl Barker (born 1960), Australian opera singer
 Chris Barker (1980–2020), English footballer
 Christopher Barker (1529–1599), Queen's Printer
 Cicely Mary Barker (1895–1973), British illustrator who created the Flower Fairies
 Cliff Barker (1921–1998), American basketball player
 Clive Barker (artist, born 1940), Pop Art sculptor
 Clive Barker (born 1952), British horror author
 Collet Barker (1784–1831), British explorer in South Australia

D–K
 David G. Barker (born 1952), American herpetologist
 Dean Barker (Born 1973), New Zealand yachtsman
 Dominic Barker (born 1966), British children's author
 E. Florence Barker (1840–1897), American clubwoman; first president of the National Woman's Relief Corps 
 Ed Barker (1931–2012), American football player
 Eddie Barker (1927–2012), American journalist
 Edmund Henry Barker (1788–1839), British classical scholar
 Edward Barker (cartoonist) (1950–1997), English cartoonist
 Edwin Barker (born 1954), American classical bassist 
 Eileen Barker (born 1938), British sociologist
 Elinor Barker (born 1994), British racing cyclist
 Elwood Barker (1878–1953), American politician
 Emily Barker (born 1980), Australian singer-songwriter
 Ernest Barker (1874–1960), an English political scientist and writer
 Eugene C. Barker (1874–1956), American historian
 Evelyn Barker (1894–1983), British General
 George Barker (disambiguation)
 Glyn Barker (born 1953), British businessman
 Gordon Barker (1931–2006), English cricketer
 Guy Barker, (born 1957), English jazz trumpeter and composer
 Harley Granville-Barker (1877–1946), English actor, director, producer, critic and playwright
 Helen Morton Barker (1834-1910), American social reformer
 Henry Rodman Barker (1841–1901), Mayor of Providence, Rhode Island 1889–91
 Herbert Barker (1883–1924), English golfer and golf course architect
 Horace Barker (1907–2000), American biochemist and microbiologist
 Howard Barker (born 1946), British playwright
 Jack Barker (1907–1982), English footballer
 Jacob Barker (1779–1871), American financier
 James Barker (disambiguation)
 Jane Barker (1652–1732), British poet and novelist
 Jared Barker (born 1975), Canadian rugby player
 Jeff Barker (disambiguation)
 John Barker (disambiguation)
 Jonathan Dylan Barker, American writer
 Joseph Barker (disambiguation)
 Kenneth L. Barker (born 1931), biblical Hebrew scholar and translator of the NASB and NIV English Bibles
 Kenneth Barker (academic) (born 1934), British academic administrator
 Kenneth Barker (cricketer) (1877–1938), English cricketer
 Kevin Barker (born 1975), baseball player

L–Q
 Len Barker (born 1955), baseball pitcher
 Les Barker (born 1947), British comedian
 Lex Barker (1919–1973), American actor, known for his Tarzan films and German Cowboy films
 Lloyd Barker (born 1943), Barbadian cricket umpire
 Lloyd Barker (soccer) (born 1970), footballer and coach
 Lucette Barker (1816–1905), English painter
 Luke Barker (born 1992), American baseball player
 M. A. R. Barker (born Philip Barker), (1929–2012), retired professor, fantasy novels and roleplaying games writer
 Ma Barker (1873–1935), reputed American gang leader
 Margaret Barker (born 1944), Biblical scholar
 Margaret Barker (artist) (1907–2003), British artist
 Maurice Barker (1917–2000), English cricketer
 Meg-John Barker (born 1974), British author, academic, activist and psychotherapist
 Merton Barker (1867–1954), English cricketer and international field hockey player
 Mike or Michael Barker (disambiguation)
 Mickey Barker (born 1956), English footballer
 Mildred Barker (1897–1990), Shaker leader, musician, scholar, and theologian
 Nicholas Barker (born 1973), British heavy metal drummer
 Nick Barker, Australian singer-songwriter and guitarist
 Nigel Barker (disambiguation)
 Pat Barker (born 1943), British author
 Paul Barker (born 1958), American bass guitarist
 Paul Barker (writer) (1968–1986), editor of New Society
 Paula Barker (born 1972), British Member of Parliament elected 2019
 Peter Barker (disambiguation)
 Phil Barker (born 1932), wargame designer
 Pierre A. Barker (1790–1870), American politician, mayor of Buffalo, New York

R–Z
 Ralph Barker (1917–2011), English writer on the RAF
 Reginald Barker (1886–1945), film director
 Robert Barker (disambiguation)
 Roger Barker (1903–1990), American psychologist
 Ronnie Barker (1929–2005), British comedy actor
 S. Omar Barker (1894–1985), American cowboy poet, politician rancher, and teacher
 Sally Barker (born 1959), British singer and songwriter
 Samuel Barker (Canadian politician) (1839–1915), Canadian parliamentarian and lawyer
 Samuel Barker (Hebraist) (1686–1759), English Hebraist
 Samuel Barker (MP for Cricklade) (died 1708), British member of Parliament for Cricklade
 Shaun Barker (born 1982), English footballer
 Simon Barker (born 1964), English footballer
 Stephen F. Barker (1927–2019), American philosopher of mathematics
 Sue Barker (born 1956), British television presenter and former professional tennis player
 Thomas Barker (disambiguation)
 Tracy M. Barker (born 1957), American herpetologist
 Travis Barker (born 1975), American drummer for the bands Blink 182, Plus-44, Box Car Racer
 Trevor Barker (1956–1996), Australian rules footballer, died of cancer
 Wes Barker (born 1986), Canadian magician
 Wharton Barker (1846–1921), American financier
 Will Barker (1867–1951), film producer, director, cinematographer 
 William Barker (disambiguation)

See also
 Justice Barker (disambiguation)

References

English-language surnames
Occupational surnames
English-language occupational surnames